Jean Crubelier is a French actor. In 1980, he starred in Le Voyage en douce under director Michel Deville.

References

External links

French male film actors
Possibly living people
Year of birth missing (living people)